The Sadh are a Hindu sect in northern India.

Sadh or SADH may also refer to:
 Sadh Vaishnavism, another Hindu tradition
 Daminozide, a plant growth regulator
 N-succinylarginine dihydrolase, an enzyme
 Amit Sadh (born 1983), Indian actor

See also 
 Sadh Sangat, in Sikhism
 Satnampanth or Satnami, religious movement in Chhattisgarh, India